Lynn Morris (born January 22, 1949) is an American politician. He was a member of the Missouri House of Representatives, having served between 2013 and 2020. He is a member of the Republican party. Morris was term-limited and left office at the conclusion of the 2020 legislative session.

References

Living people
Republican Party members of the Missouri House of Representatives
1949 births
21st-century American politicians